"Reminding Me" is a song by Canadian singer-songwriter Shawn Hook featuring American actress and singer Vanessa Hudgens. Hook co-wrote the pop ballad with Jonas Jeberg and Ethan Thompson. It was released to digital retailers and streaming platforms on April 21, 2017, through Hollywood Records and Universal Music Canada as the lead single from Hook's EP My Side of Your Story. "Reminding Me" also impacted American contemporary hit radio on May 16, 2017.

Commercial performance
"Reminding Me" debuted at number 92 on the Billboard Canadian Hot 100 chart dated May 20, 2017.

Track listings
Digital download – single
 "Reminding Me" (featuring Vanessa Hudgens) – 3:29

Remixes – EP
 "Reminding Me" (featuring Vanessa Hudgens) (Shaun Frank Remix) – 3:01
 "Reminding Me" (featuring Vanessa Hudgens) (Price & Takis Remix) – 4:00
 "Reminding Me" (featuring Vanessa Hudgens) (DJ Mike D Remix) – 3:38

Music video
An accompanying black and white music video directed by Aya Tanimura premiered April 21, 2017 in conjunction with the song's digital release. It shows the duet partners individually mourning a past relationship in a mansion, with Hook stationed primarily by the piano and Hudgens by an expansive window and then an indoor pool. Later, there are scenes of the two getting intimate in a bed. The video drew praise for Hudgens's "sex appeal" and glamorous look.

Charts and certifications

Weekly charts

Year-end charts

Certifications

Release history

References

2017 songs
2017 singles
Vanessa Hudgens songs
Male–female vocal duets
Pop ballads
Hollywood Records singles
Universal Music Group singles
Songs written by Jonas Jeberg